Psst is a common misspelling of:

Pssst, a video game released for the ZX Spectrum
Psssssst, a hair care product
P$$t, a brand of Kroger food products